The Montour family is a family of Native-American and French descent which was prominent in colonial New York and Pennsylvania before and during the American Revolution. Because of the Iroquois practice of reckoning descent through the female line, the family is known as "Montour" after the matriarch.

Madam Montour

Madam Montour (1667–c.1753).  Information on Madam Montour is fragmentary and contradictory. Even her given name is uncertain.

According to her own account:

Current research indicates that she was born Élisabeth (or Isabelle) Couc around 1667, in Trois-Rivières, Quebec, the daughter of Pierre Couc and Marie Mitouamegoukoue, an Algonquin.

She was apparently married three times, the last to an Oneida named Carondawanna (Karontowá:nen—Big Tree), who later took the name "Robert Hunter" after the Governor of New York whom he met at the Albany Conference of 1711. By Carondawanna Madam Montour had at least several children:
 Andrew (Sattelihu)
 Margaret, known as French Margaret
 a daughter, who may have been named Catherine
 Lewis (Tau-weson)
 Henry (most sources say Henry and Andrew were the same person: "Andrew Montour who by the name of Henry Montour,"—from his land grant)

Her husband was killed about 1729 in battle with the Catawba; after the death of her husband the family moved to Otstonwakin, on the Lawi-sahquick (Loyalsock Creek), now Montoursville, Lycoming County, Pennsylvania.

She served as interpreter on several occasions, notably Albany in 1711, and Philadelphia in 1727.  Her skills were highly valued such that in 1719 the Commissioners for Indian Affairs in Albany decreed that she should receive "a man's pay."

Andrew Montour

Andrew Montour (c. 1720–1772) was the eldest son of Madam Montour. He was commissioned a captain by the British in 1754 during the French and Indian War. Later he  commanded of a raiding party in Ohio in 1764 during Pontiac's Rebellion (1763-1766). He was granted land in  Pennsylvania by the colonial government. He married Sally Ainse. His son John served on the side of the colonists in the American Revolution. Another son, Nicholas, became a wealthy businessman and landowner in Canada.

Margaret Montour
Margaret Montour, (1690–), also known as French Margaret, the eldest daughter (some say niece) of Madam Montour, was married to an Iroquois named Katarioniecha (Peter Quebeck), a Mohawk. They resided at a village called on a 1759 map "French Margaret's Town" (Wenschpochkechung), on the west branch of the Susquehanna at the mouth of Lycoming Creek (now Williamsport, Pennsylvania). The couple had at least five children:
 Catherine (French Catherine)
 Esther (Queen Esther)
 Nicholas
 a son who was killed around 1753 fighting the Creeks
 Mary, or Molly.

Like her mother, Margaret attended treaty conferences and often interpreted.

Lewis Montour
Lewis Montour, the son of Madam Montour, was killed during the French and Indian War.

Catherine Montour

Catherine Montour (1710–c.1780), or French Catherine, was the daughter of French Margaret. She married Thomas Huston or Hudson (Telenemut). Their children were Roland, John, Amochol(son), and Belle. Catherine died c. 1780-81. Her home was a large village at the head of Seneca Lake, New York called Shequaga, or Catherine's Town.

Esther Montour

Esther Montour, (c.1720–), called Queen Esther, was the eldest daughter of French Margaret. She married Echogohund, chief of the Munsee Delawares, and became their leader following his death. Her home was at Sheshequin (now Ulster Township, Bradford County, Pennsylvania). During the American Revolution, she was present at the Battle of Wyoming (also known as the Wyoming Massacre) in 1778. According to some sources, enraged by the death of her son two days earlier, she participated in the torture and murder of thirty or so of the enemy; as one puts it, "she was the most infuriated demon in that carnival of blood."  Others dispute this, saying either that reports of atrocities were propaganda, or that Esther did not participate. According to one story she was killed by Thomas Hartley later that year, although other sources state that she died around the year 1800 on Cayuga Lake in New York.

Mary Montour
Mary Montour was the daughter of French Margaret Montour. She married Kanaghragait (John Cook), called "The White Mingo" (died 1790). Mary was baptized in Philadelphia by a Catholic priest. In 1791, on the removal of the Moravian mission from New Salem (Petquotting) to Canada, Mary accompanied them.  She was fluent in "English, French, Mohawk (her mother tongue), Wyandot [Huron], Ottawa, Chippewa, Shawnese, and Delaware."

Roland Montour

Roland Montour (–1780?), also spelled Rowland, was the eldest son of Catherine Montour. He was married to a daughter of the Seneca chief Sayenqueraghta, known as "Old King" or "Old Smoke," by his Cayuga wife.

He was active in the American Revolution on the British side.  He participated in the raid that captured Benjamin Gilbert.

He is reputed to have died in September, 1780, in Painted Post, New York of wounds received in the Sugarloaf Massacre at Little Nescopeck Creek, Pennsylvania. However sources say he lived for several years after the massacre.

"Stuttering John" Montour 
John Montour (–c.1830; also known as "Stuttering John") was the son of Catherine Montour, the younger brother of Roland. He died about 1830 at Big Tree, New York.

John Montour 
John Montour (1744–1788) was the son of Andrew Montour. He fought on the British side in the American Revolution until 1778, when he was imprisoned in Detroit by Henry Hamilton for helping some prisoners escape. After this he switched sides and supported the Colonists.

His mother was a Delaware, the granddaughter of Sassoonam.

Nicholas Montour

Nicholas Montour (1756–1808) was the son of Andrew Montour and Sally Ainse.
He was a fur trader, seigneur, and political figure in Lower Canada.

Simplified family tree
Many details are unclear and contradictory. This chart shows two possible identifications for Madam Montour (green boxes), and two possible lines of descent for French Margaret and Andrew Montour.

Place names
The following places are named for members of the Montour family:
 Catharine, New York
Catharine Creek
Montour County, Pennsylvania
Montour Ridge, Montour County
 Montour Township, in Columbia County, Pennsylvania
 Montour, New York
 Montour Falls, New York
 Montour Run, a creek in Columbia County, Pennsylvania
Montour's Island, in Allegheny County, Pennsylvania
 Montoursville, Pennsylvania
 Queen Catharine's Marsh, New York
 Queen Esther's Rock, village of Wyoming, Pennsylvania

See also
History of Lycoming County, Pennsylvania

References

Native American history of Pennsylvania
People of New York in the French and Indian War
People of Pennsylvania in the French and Indian War
Native Americans in the American Revolution
Native American people from Pennsylvania
 
Montour